William Miller (28 May 1796 – 20 January 1882) was a Scottish Quaker line engraver and watercolourist from Edinburgh.

Life
Miller became an apprentice to William Archibald in 1814. His first published engraving was in that year, of an apple tree for William Archibald. This engraving appeared in Vol I of the Royal Caledonian Horticultural Society. He spent four years with William Archibald, then setting up on his own account. At the end of 1819 he moved to Hackney to join the workshop of George Cooke. The premium paid for his 18-month stay with Cooke was £240. Other apprentices with Cooke included William Shotter Boys.

In the 1830s his address is listed as 4 Hope Park, in the Meadows area of Edinburgh.

Works
Whilst an apprentice with Cooke, Miller drew a series of plants from the neighbouring nursery of Loddiges. These were engraved by Cooke and published in volumes v - vii of Loddiges Botanical Cabinet, London, J. and A. Arch, 1820 - 1822.

Miller was one of the principal engravers of J. M. W. Turner.

James Giles, one of William Miller's pupils, wrote some reminiscences of his time as an apprentice at Hope Park. Writing from Redhill on 17 September 1883 (published privately in Memorials of Hope Park):

"Wm Miller's admiration of Turner was unbounded, and his pupils soon caught the infection. The drawings, which at first sight looked so mysterious and unintelligible, the more they were pondered, unfolded their wondrous meaning and beauty; and from my own experience I can testify, that sitting for weeks before the same drawing, I did not tire over them, as was the case with inferior pictures. The plates executed from 1833 to 1836 consisted of the illustrations to Scott's Works, Turner's 'Annual Tour', Gainsborough's 'Watering Place', a large Venice, by Turner and, of course, some plates of less note.  The plates for Rogers's poems were engraved before my time, but not published till afterwards; these are probably the most exquisite gems that ever were, or ever will be produced. I beg however to differ from Ruskin in my estimate of them. I like Loch Lomond, and the old Ancestral Hall better than the vignette, with the fountain, at the beginning of the volume...........The Gainsborough was entirely the work of your father's own hand; it was done from a smaller copy of the original in the National Gallery. The pencil drawing was sent as usual to be transferred by the printer through the rolling press on to the etching ground, but when it came back the drawing was found to have shifted during the process, and the transferred outlines were thick and blurred. I should have been appalled, but your father made light of it, and etched away as if it had been all right.
"I need hardly say that it is as the interpreter of Turner your father's fame very much rests, and that Turner himself preferred 'the Scotch Quaker' to all other engravers. The skill with which he translated the high aerial effects was beyond all rivalry..........

"In making the outline drawings for transference to the plate, we were instructed to preserve every minute touch, indeed, keeping the touch was a point much insisted on. I remember an amusing instance of this. I was etching the Pass of Killicrankie, a vignette for Scott's Works; cottages were in flames, and the dead lying in the foreground; in the distance was a row of dark spots - the subject suggested they might be a regiment of soldiers, at the same time they looked very much like fir-trees. I asked your father's opinion, he reply was 'Oh, just keep the touch, and they can be taken for either.' He was not, however, so particular in the case of architecture; and when Edinburgh, from St. Anthony's Chapel, was in hand, he sent me to the spot to make sketches of the principal buildings in the distance. The High School in Turner's drawing was little more than a white patch. Your father did the foreground, and I believe, the sheep, but St. Anthony's Chapel, and the various distant buildings were etched by me - the latter from the sketches I had taken. For closeness of line and minute detail, it is the most laborious plate I was ever engaged on, and will, I believe, bear looking at through a magnifier. Of course, the beautiful effects depend entirely on the finish of your father. I had only to do with the mechanical part - the body - the soul is his. In the case of Turner's figures, perhaps keeping the touch was carried too far.

"Your father usually etched the foreground of the plates his pupils worked upon; and was fond of etching water, both rough and smooth, which was remarkable for its liquid effect.

"Turner's touched proofs were always an object of interest in the workroom. I recollect on the margin of one of them he had written. 'Mr Miller will please return all my touched proofs.' Whether this was done I cannot say; but they are generally considered the property of the engraver. They must be of considerable value."

Large single prints by Miller after Turner include The Grand Canal for Hodgson and Graves, 1837; Modern Italy for F G Moon, issued as the Presentation Plate for the National Art Union in 1843; and The Rhine, Osterprey and Feltzen for D T White in 1852.

His last engraved work was a series of vignettes after Myles Birket Foster to illustrate two volumes of the poems of Thomas Hood, published by Moxon in 1871 and 1872.

Bibliography of works illustrated by William Miller
Memoirs of the Caledonian Horticultural Society Volume First. Edinburgh: Printed by Neill & Co. for Archibald Constable and Company; and for Longman, Hurst, Rees, Orme and Brown, London, 1814.
Encyclopædia Britannica 5th Edition, at the Encyclopaedia Press, For Archibald Constable and Company, and Thomson Bonar, Edinburgh: Gale, Curtis, and Fenner, London; and Thomas Wilson and Sons, York, 1817.
The Botanical Cabinet Consisting of Coloured Delineations of Plants from all countries. Plates by George Cooke. Conrad Loddiges. London: John & Arthur Arch, 1818.
Engravings of the Skeleton of the Human Body. John Gordon MD. Blackwood, Edinburgh 1818.
Transactions of the Royal Society of Edinburgh Vol IX, Edinburgh: Printed (by Patrick Neill) for William & Charles Tait, Prince's Street, and Longman, Hurst, Rees, Orme, & Brown, London, 1823.
Scottish Cryptogamic Flora or Coloured Figures and Descriptions of Cryptogamic Plants, belonging chiefly to the Order Fungi; and Intended to serve as a Continuation of English Botany. Robert Kaye Greville. Edinburgh: Printed (by P. Neill) for MacLachlan & Stewart, Edinburgh; and Baldwin, Cradock & Joy, London, 1823-1828 (Plesch 301; Margadant, Greville 5; Nissen 757).
An Account of the Bell Rock Lighthouse by Robert Stevenson, Edinburgh Printed for Archibald Constable and Co, Edinburgh; Hurst, Robinson and Co and Josiah Taylor, London, 1824.
An Essay on Gothic Architecture by T. Rickman, Architect. Third edn. Thomas Rickman. Liverpool: Geo. Smith. 1825.
Picturesque Views on the Southern Coast of England from drawings made principally by J.M.W. Turner, R.A. and engraved by W.B. Cooke, George Cooke and other eminent engravers, John and Arthur Arch, London 1826.
Provincial Antiquities and Picturesque Scenery of Scotland, Walter Scott, J M W Turner and others, John and Arthur Arch, London 1826.
Edinburgh from Arthur's Seat after H W Williams, Published by John Shepherd, 15 Princes Street, Edinburgh, 1826. The print was republished in 1846 by Shepherd and Elliott modified to include the National Monument and Scott Monument, with the omission of the parasol held by the woman in the foreground.
Select Views In Greece With Classical Illustrations. Williams, Hugh William. London: Longman Rees Orme Brown and Green; and Adam Black. 1829
Ancient Sarcophagi. Plataea;
Ancient Temple at Corinth;
Caritena, Ancient Brenthe;
Corinth. Apocorinthus of Corinth;
Delphi, Castalian Fountain, on Mount Parnassus;
Eleusis, & Part of the Island of Salamis;
Mount Oleno, Peloponnesus;
Mountains of Locri Ozolae, looking towards Naupactus;
Nemea;
Part of Misitra, the Ancient Sparta;
Parthenon of Athens;
Patras (Ancient Patrae) Achaia;
Plain of Orchomenos from Livadia;
Plain of Plataea, from Mount Cithaeron;
Promontary of Sunium from the Sea;
Rocks of the Strophades;
Temple of Minerva, Acropolis of Athens;
Temples of Jupiter Panhellenius, Aegina;
View Looking across the Isthmus of Corinth
The Winter's Wreath for MDCCCXXIX. A Collection of Original Contributions in Prose and Verse. London: Published by George B. Whitaker; and George Smith, Liverpool. 1829
View on the Thames near Windsor
The Morbid Anatomy of the Gullet, Stomach and Intestines. Alexander Monro, tertius. Second Edition. Edinburgh: John Carfrae and Son; and Longman, Rees, Orme, Brown and Green, London. 1830
Tapeworms Plate IV
Select Views Of The Royal Palaces Of Scotland, From Drawings by William Brown, Glasgow; With Illustrative Descriptions Of Their Local Situation, Present Appearance, And Antiquities. John Jamieson. Cadell & Co & Simpkin Marshall, Edinburgh & London 1830
Carrick Castle;
Dunfermline Palace;
Dunoon Castle;
Dunstuffnage Castle;
Falkland Palace;
Kildrummie Castle in Mar;
Court of Linlithgow Palace;
Linlithgow Palace;
Lochmaben Castle;
Rothsay Castle Bute;
Roxburgh Castle;
Scone Palace;
Traquair
Transactions of the Society of Antiquaries of Scotland, Vol III, 1831
Recumbent effigies of Menzies of Pitfodels, Lady Menzies, and Thomas Gordon of Rivan, 1831;
Ancient Monuments in the Church of Kinkell, 1831;
Curious Bronze Relic found near the Estuary of the River Findhorn, engraving after Sir Thos Dick Lauder, 1831
The Pilot. James Fenimore Cooper. London, T Allmann and Son, 42 Holborn Hill, 1832
The Pilot
A Topographical and Historical Account of Linlithgowshire by the late John Penney. Edinburgh Stevenson, Prince's St, 1832
Linlithgow Palace
The Landscape Annual for 1830. The Tourist in Switzerland and Italy. Roscoe, Thomas. Illustrated from Drawings by S Prout. London: Robert Jennings and William Chaplin. 62, Cheapside 1830
Lake of Como
The Landscape Annual for 1831. The Tourist in Italy. Roscoe, Thomas. London: Robert Jennings and William Chaplin. 1831
Borghese Palace, Rome
The Landscape Annual for 1832. The Tourist in Italy. Roscoe, Thomas. Illustrated from Drawings by J.S. Harding. London: Robert Jennings and William Chaplin. 62, Cheapside 1832
Isola Bella, Lago Maggiore
The Keepsake for MDCCCXXXI, Reynolds, Frederic Mansel. London: Longman, Rees, Orme, Brown and Green, 1831
The Seashore, Cornwall
The Keepsake for MDCCCXXXII, Reynolds, Frederic Mansel. London: Longman, Rees, Orme, Brown and Green, 1832
Marly
The Keepsake for MDCCCXXXIV, Reynolds, Frederic Mansel. London: Longman, Rees, Orme, Brown and Green, 1834
Palace of La Belle Gabrielle on the Seine
The Winter's Wreath for MDCCCXXXI. A Collection of Original Contributions in Prose and Verse. London: Published by George B. Whitaker; and George Smith, Liverpool. 1831
'The Bandit's Home' after J V Barber : The Bandit's Home
'Delos' after William Linton: Delos
Remarks on the Comparative Merits of Cast Metal and Malleable Iron Railways; and an account of the Stockton and Darlington Railway and the Liverpool and Manchester Railway &c &c. Printed By Charles Henry Cook, (successor to the late Edw. Walker Pilgrim-Street Newcastle, 1832
Plan and Section of the Intended Branch Railways from the Stockton and Darlington Main Railway to the River Tess in the Counties of Durham and York, 1827, Thomas Storey Engineer, Richard Otley Surveyor, W Miller Sc. Edinr;
Side and end views of a locomotive engine similar to the Planet employed on the Liverpool and Manchester Railway manufactured by Messrs. Rob. Stephenson & Co., Newcastle upon Tyne
Westmoreland, Cumberland, Durham & Northumberland. Illustrated from original drawings by Thomas Allom etc. With historical & topographical descriptions by Thomas Rose. Fisher Son and Co., London 1832
Llanercost Priory, Cumberland;
Newcastle upon Tyne, from New Chatham, Gateshead;
North and South Shields, Taken from the Rocks near Teignmouth;
Ullswater from Pooly Bridge
The Literary Souvenir for 1832. Alaric A Watts. London, Longman, Rees, Orme, Brown and Green, 1832
Tower of London
The Literary Souvenir for 1833. Alaric A Watts. London, Longman, Rees, Orme, Brown and Green, 1833
Fairies on the Seashore
Lyrics of the Heart and Other Poems. Alaric A. Watts. London: Longman, Brown, Green and Longmans. 1851
Sunset (after Claude);
Mount Aetna (after Claude);
Richmond Hill;
The Halt in the Desert
The Winter's Wreath for MDCCCXXXII. A Collection of Original Contributions in Prose and Verse. London: Published by George B. Whitaker; and George Smith, Liverpool. 1832.
The Wreck
Heath's Picturesque Annual for 1832, Travelling Sketches in the North of Italy, the Tyrol, and on the Rhine. With Twenty Six Beautifully Finished Engravings from Drawings by Clarkson Stanfield. Charles Heath. London: Published for the Proprietor by Longman, Rees, Orme, Brown and Green. 1832
Klumm;
Trent
Heath's Picturesque Annual for 1833; Travelling Sketches on the Rhine, and in Belgium and Holland. With Twenty Six Beautifully Finished Engravings from Drawings by Clarkson Stanfield. Charles Heath. London: Published for the Proprietor by Longman, Rees, Orme, Brown, Green, & Longman. 1833
Homeward Bound, Distant View of Brill
Heath's Picturesque Annual for 1834; Travelling Sketches on the Sea Coasts of France. With Beautifully Finished Engravings from Drawings by Clarkson Stanfield. Charles Heath. London: Published for the Proprietor by Longman, Rees, Orme, Brown and Green. 1834
Dieppe;
Mont St Michel, Within the Walls
Views In The East comprising India, Canton. and The Shores of The Red Sea with Historical and Descriptive Illustrations. Elliot, Captain Robert R.N. H. Fisher, Son & Co., Newgate Street, London 1833
Tomb of Humaioon Delhi;
Delhi, engraving after W Purser, 1833;
Thubare;
Seven-storied Palace at Bejapore;
The British Residency at Hyderabad
Illustrations: Landscape, Historical, and Antiquarian, to The Poetical Works of Sir Walter Scott, Bart. London, Charles Tilt, 1834 (first published as Rokeby, the frontispiece to The Aurora Borealis, the Friends' Annual, Newcastle upon Tyne 1833)
Glen of the Greta

Poems, Samuel Rogers. London, Printed for T. Cadell, Strand; and E. Moxon 1834"
A Garden
Old Manor House;
Venice, The Rialto - Moonlight;
Loch Lomond
Turner's Annual Tour - The Loire, Ritchie, Leitch and Turner, J M W, Longman, Rees, Orme, Brown, Green and Longman, London 1833
Nantes;
Between Clairemont and Mauves;
Chateau de Nantes
Turner's Annual Tour - The Seine, Ritchie, Leitch and Turner, J M W, Longman, Rees, Orme, Brown, Green and Longman, London 1834
Rouen;
Rouen St Catherine's Hill
Turner's Annual Tour - The Seine, Ritchie, Leitch and Turner, J M W, Longman, Rees, Orme, Brown, Green and Longman, London 1835
Pont Neuf;
Melun
The Poetical Works of Sir Walter Scott, Bart. Each Volume to have a Frontispiece and Vignette Title-page from designs taken from real scenes by J.W. Turner, R.A. Edinburgh: Robert Cadell, Edinburgh; Whittaker, Treacher, and Arnot, London; John Cumming, Dublin 1833 - 1834
Dryburgh Abbey;
Melrose;
Edinburgh from Blackford Hill;
Loch Katrine;
Loch Achray;
Skiddaw;
Berwick-upon-Tweed
The Miscellaneous Prose Works of Sir Walter Scott, Bart. Embellished with Portraits, Frontispieces, Vignette Titles and Maps. The Designs of the Landscapes from Real Scenes by J.M.W. Turner, R.A.. Edinburgh: Robert Cadell, Edinburgh; Whitaker, Arnot, and Company, London; John Cumming, Dublin 1834 - 1836
Dumbarton Castle;
Brussels;
Hougemont;
New Abbey, near Dumfries;
Norham Castle, Moonrise;
Jerusalem;
Brienne;
Venice, the Campanile;
Placenza;
Verona;
Vincennes;
St Cloud;
Mayence;
The Simplon;
Paris from Pere-la-Chaise;
Malmaison;
Fontainebleau;
Chiefswood Cottage;
The Rhymer's Glen;
Edinburgh from St Anthony's Chapel;
Craigmillar Castle;
Dunstaffnage;
Linlithgow;
Glencoe;
Killiecrankie;
Inverness;
Fort Augustus;
Craig Crook Castle, near Edinburgh
Stanfield's Coast Scenery. a Series of Views in the British Channel, from Original Drawings Taken Expressly for the Work. Clarkson Stanfield. Smith, Elder and Co., London, 1836
Botallack Mine, Cornwall;
Hastings;
Havre de Grace
The Poetical Works of Thomas Campbell. Edward Moxon, London 1837
The Dead Eagle - Oran
Picturesque Views in England and Wales. From Drawings by J.M.W. Turner, engraved under the superintendence of Mr. Charles Heath with descriptive and historic illustrations written by Hannibal Evans Lloyd. London: Longman, Orme, Brown, Green, and Longmans, 1838
Straits of Dover;
Great Yarmouth, Norfolk;
Stamford, Lincolnshire;
Windsor Castle, Berkshire;
Chatham, Kent;
Carew Castle, Pembroke;
Durham Cathedral
Loch an Eilan, engraving by William Miller after Horatio McCulloch, Royal Association for the Promotion of the Fine Arts in Scotland, 1839
Loch an Eilan
The Land of Burns, A Series of Landscapes and Portraits, Illustrative of the Life and Writings of the Scottish Poet (1840).
Beauties of Modern Poetry (1840).
Engravings from the Pictures of the National Gallery (1840).
The History and Antiquities of the County Palatine of Durham; compiled from original records, preserved in public repositories and private collections: and illustrated by engravings of architectural and monumental antiquities, portraits of eminent persons, etc. etc. etc. (4 Vols). Surtees, Robert, London: printed by and for Nichols, Son, and Bentley .. and G. Andrews, Durham Volume 1 1816, volume 2 1820, volume 3 1823, volume 4 1840
Limekilns at Southwick on the Wear after Edward Swinburne 1826;
Shields Harbour after Edward Swinburne 1827;
Lower Tees near Dinsdale open etching after Edward Swinburne 1832;
Lower Tees near Dinsdale after Edward Swinburne 1832;
High Force on the Tees after Edward Swinburne 1832
Waverley Novels (Abbotsford Edition). Walter Scott. Edinburgh and London: Robert Cadell, Houlston & Stoneman 1842 - 1847
Highland Hills, from the Teith below Callender;
Holyrood House and Chapel, from Calton Hill;
View of James' Court Edinburgh;
Queensferry, from the South-east;
Bass Rock, East Lothian;
Loch Ard;
Edinburgh, from St Anthony's Chapel;
View from Fast Castle;
Tantallon Castle;
Durrenstein on the Danube;
York Minster, Moonlight View;
Loch Leven and Castle;
Barnbougle Castle and Firth of Forth, from Lauriestone Castle;
Warwick Castle;
View on the Coast of Zetland, near the Ness, Moonlight;
Castle Rushen, Castletown, Isle of Man;
Peel Castle, Isle of Man;
Cologne;
Tours;
Liege;
Abbotsford, from the North Bank of the Tweed;
Peebles and River Tweed, from Neidpath Castle;
St Mary's Loch;5
Dumfries;
The Mouth of the Annan, and Solway Firth, Skiddaw in the Distance;
Pass of Llanberis, Caernarvonshire;
Pass of Nantfrangon, Caernarvonshire;
The Dead Sea;
Worcester;
Kilchurn Castle;
Selkirk;
Constantinople;
Ruins of Laodicea
Art and Song. A Series of Original Highly Finished Steel Engravings from Masterpieces of Art of the Nineteenth Century. Bell, Robert (Ed), Bell and Daldy, London 1867
Tynemouth Priory;
Flamborough Head;
Evening
The Book of Gems from the Poets and Artists of Great Britain. The Eighteenth and Nineteenth Century. Wordsworth to Tennyson. Hall, Samuel Carter. Bell and Daldy, London 1866
The Minstrel;
Sunrise;
St Michael's Mount
The Imperial Family Bible According to the Authorized Version (John Martin Illustrator) Glasgow, Edinburgh, and London: Blackie & Son. 1844
The Giving of the Law;
The Deluge
Black's Picturesque Tourist of Scotland with an Accurate Travelling Map, Engraved Charts, and Views of the Scenery; Plans of Edinburgh and Glasgow; and a Copious Itinerary. Adam & Charles Black, Edinburgh; various editions from 1846
Entrance to Loch Skavaig, Skye
Kilchurn Castle, Loch Awe engraving by William Miller after J M W Turner, Rawlinson 664 first published state; engraved exclusively for the Members of the Association for the Promotion of the Fine Arts in Scotland, 1847
Kilchurn Castle, Loch Awe
Finden's Royal Gallery of British Art, Published by the Proprietors, at 18 and 19, Southampton Place, Euston Square; sold by F. G. Moon, 20, Threadneedle Street, and Ackermann & Co., Strand, London, 1838–1849
Sunset at Sea after a Storm after Francis Danby;
Battle of Trafalgar after Clarkson Stanfield
The Castles, Palaces and Prisons of Mary of Scotland. Charles Mackie. London. C Cox, 12, King William St, Strand, Oliver & Boyd Edinburgh, David Robertson, Bookseller to the Queen Glasgow, James Chalmers Dundee, & J Robertson Dublin. 1849
Lochleven Castle;
Edinburgh Castle;
Dunbar Castle;
Linlithgow Castle;
Crookston Castle
Memoirs of the Life of Sir A Agnew of Lochnaw. London and Edinburgh: 1850
Lochnaw, proof engraving after R K Greville, 1850
The Rhine - Osterprey and Feltzen engraving by William Miller after J M W Turner, Rawlinson 669 first published state 1852
The Rhine - Osterprey and Feltzen
Italian Goatherds, detail from engraving by William Miller after J S Lauder, Royal Association for the Promotion of the Fine Arts in Scotland, 1843
Italian Goatherds
"The Cotter's Saturday Night", Royal Association for the Promotion of the Fine Arts in Scotland, 1853
"The toil-worn cottar frae his labour goes";
"Th' expectant wee things, toddlin, stacher thro'"
Tam O'Shanter, Illustrated with six large engravings by John Faed RSA. Royal Association for the Promotion of the Fine Arts in Scotland, 1855
View of Ayr
Six Engravings for the Members of the Royal Association for Promotion of the Fine Arts in Scotland, Royal Association for the Promotion of the Fine Arts in Scotland, 1863
The Port of London
Eight Engravings in Illustration of Waverley. For the Members of the Royal Association for Promotion of the Fine Arts in Scotland, Royal Association for the Promotion of the Fine Arts in Scotland, 1865
Tulleveolan
The Art-Union: Monthly Journal of The Fine Arts, and the Arts, Decorative, and Ornamental. Volume 9. Palmer and Clayton, London, 1847
Dryburgh Abbey: the Grave of Scott;
Pool of Thames;
Prince of Orange Landing at Torbay;
The Watering Place;
Dover - the Landing of Prince Albert;
Vietri;
The Shipwreck;
The Battle of Trafalgar;
Spithead;
Line Fishing off Hastings;
Modern Italy;
Wreck off Hastings
Edward Pease
Edward Pease (1767-1858), portrait engraving by William Miller, approximately 1859
Rab and His Friends. Dr John Brown F.R.S.E.. Edmonston and Douglas, Edinburgh. 1862
Rab's Grave
The Imperial Bible Dictionary - Historical, Biographical, Geographical and Doctrinal - Illustrated by numerous engravings - Including the natural history, antiquities, manners, customs, and religious rites and ceremonies mentioned in the scriptures, and an account of the several books of the old and new Testaments. Patrick Fairbairn. London: Blackie and Son, Paternoster Row 1866
Bethlehem;
Jerusalem from the Mount of Olives;
Antioch in Syria from the South West;
The Town and Isthmus of Corinth
Unpublished engravings by William Miller after Birket Foster
Peterborough;
Stratford
Yorkshire Past and Present: a history and a description of the three ridings of the great county of York, from the earliest ages to the year 1870; with an account of its manufactures, commerce, and civil and mechanical engineering. Including an account of the woollen trade of Yorkshire by Edward Baines. Baines, Thomas. London: William Mackenzie, 22 Paternoster Row. 1871
Bolton Abbey
Hood's Poems, illustrated by Birket Foster, E. Moxon, Son & Co., London 1872
Hymn to the Sun 'Giver of glowing light';
Sonnet on Receiving a Gift 'Look how the golden ocean shines above';
The Mary 'The sea is bright with morning', p4, Hood's Poems, Moxon 1872|Bianca's Dream 'For Julio underneath the lattice play'd';
Bianca's Dream 'The next sweet even';
Ode to Rae Wilson 'Dear bells! How sweet the sounds of village bells';
Ode to Rae Wilson 'Liege's lovely environs';
Ghent;
Ode to the Moon 'Mother of light!';
To ***, with a Flask of Rhinewater 'The old catholic city was still';
The Two Peacocks of Bedfont 'There, gentle stranger, thou mays't only see';
Ode to Melancholy 'No sorrow ever chokes their throats';
The Compass, with Variations 'Twas in the Bay of Naples';
Stanzas to Tom Woodgate, 'To climb the billows's hoary brow';
The Key - A Moorish Romance 'Th' Alhambra's pile';
To -. Composed at Rotterdam 'Before me lie dark waters';
To -. Composed at Rotterdam 'I'm at Rotterdam';
The Knight and the Dragon 'On the Drachenfels' crest';
The Knight and the Dragon '- He gazed on the Rhine';
I Remember 'I remember, I remember, The fir trees dark and high';
Poem, from the Polish 'To think upon the Bridge of Kew';
Address 'Yes! where the foaming billows rave the while';
Hood's Poems, again illustrated by Birket Foster, E. Moxon, Son & Co., London 1872
The Dream of Eugene Aram 'Pleasantly shone the setting sun';
Autumn 'The autumn is old';
The Flower 'Lawk-a-daisy';
The Elm Tree Twas in a shady avenue']];
The Elm Tree 'In all its giant bulk and length';
The Haunted House 'An old deserted mansion';
The Haunted House 'And in the weedy moat the heron';
Hastings;
Hastings Beach;
Hastings 'Boiling Sea';
[[Commons:Image:'Tis midnight and the moonbeam cold and wan' touched proof engraving by William Miller after Birket Foster.jpg|The Romance of Cologne Tis midnight and the moonbeam';
The Plea of the Midsummer Fairies 'Thanks to the sweet Bard's auspicious pen';
The Mermaid of Margate 'He was saved from the hungry deep by a boat of Deal';
Hero and Leander 'Sestos and Abydos';
Hero and Leander 'Sestos and Abydos;
A Legend of Navarre 'The old chateau'

References
A Catalogue of Engravings by William Miller HRSA 1818 - 1871 By WFM (William F. Miller, his eldest son). Published privately in 1886.
Memorials of Hope Park comprising some particulars in the life of our dear father William Miller, together with a list of his engravings. By WFM (William F Miller, his eldest son). Published privately in 1886.

Notes

External links

 , an engraving  of a drawing of Delos by William Linton for The Winter's Wreath annual, 1831 with an accompanying poem The Song of Delos by Felicia Hemans. 
 Engravings for Fisher's Drawing Room Scrap Books with poetical illustrations by Letitia Elizabeth Landon:
1832:, of a painting by William Purser.
1833:, of a painting by Samuel Austin.
1833:, of a painting by William Purser.
1835: of a painting by S. Williamson.
1837: of a painting by Samuel Prout.
1836:, a painting by Robert Melville Grindlay together with an associated poetical illustration on The Nizam's Daughter.
 , an engraving of a painting by J leBlanc for The Juvenile Forget Me Not, 1837, with a poetical illustration by Letitia Elizabeth Landon

1796 births
1882 deaths
Artists from Edinburgh
19th-century engravers
Scottish engravers
Scottish printmakers
Landscape artists
Scottish watercolourists
Scottish Quakers